Shahba District is a district of the as-Suwayda Governorate in southern Syria. The administrative centre is the city of Shahba. At the 2004 census, the district had a population of 71,949.

Sub-districts
The district of Shahba is divided into four sub-districts or nawāḥī (population as of 2004):

See also
List of populated places in as-Suwayda Governorate

References

 
Districts of as-Suwayda Governorate